Games with concealed rules are games where the rules are intentionally concealed from new players, either because their discovery is part of the game itself, or because the game is a hoax and the rules do not exist. In fiction, the counterpart of the first category are games that supposedly do have a rule set, but that rule set is not disclosed.

Actual games

Discovery games
 Eleusis: A card game in which one player secretly decides on a rule which determines which cards may be played on top of each other. The other players then use deductive logic to work out the secret rule.
 Haggle: A party game in which the Gamemaster divides a set of cards and a subset of the full rules among players and allows them to trade for other cards and rules. 
 Mao: A shedding-type card game where the winner of a round adds a concealed rule of their choice to all subsequent rounds.
 Paranoia: A tabletop role-playing game in which the rules are considered "classified". Only the Gamemaster has full knowledge of the rules, while other players must deduce them by trial and error as they proceed through the game. (The game acknowledges that players may read the gamemaster section, but demonstrating knowledge of the rules is considered treasonous, and the gamemaster may also make arbitrary changes.)
Penultima: A chess variant in which the spectators make secret rules governing how the pieces move and capture. The two players are unaware of the rules and must discover them by inductive reasoning.
 Scissors: A party game in which a pair of scissors is passed between players, with the passer declaring that they are being passed "open" or "closed" based on an individual and secret rule. The other players must use observation to deduce the rule each player uses to make the declaration.
 Whose Triangle Is It?: A party game in which one player points to three people or objects, forming an imaginary triangle, and then asks "Whose triangle is it?" The triangle belongs to the first person to speak after the triangle is drawn, but this rule is not told to new players, and the game is for new players to figure out what the rule is.
 Zendo: A game in which one player creates a rule for structures to follow and the other players try to discover the rule by building structures

Hoax or joke games
 52 Pickup: A card game in which dealer scatters the cards on the floor and non-dealer must pick them up.
 Mornington Crescent: Originally a round in the BBC Radio 4 comedy panel game I'm Sorry I Haven't A Clue. The game consists of each panelist in turn announcing a landmark or street, most often a tube station on the London Underground system. The apparent aim is to be the first to announce "Mornington Crescent", a station on the Northern Line. Despite appearances, however, there are no rules to the game, and both the naming of stations and the specification of "rules" are based on stream-of-consciousness association and improvisation. Thus the game is intentionally incomprehensible.

Games in works of fiction

Games with undisclosed rules
 43-Man Squamish: Mad magazine published an article outlining a college sport designed to be unplayable. The sport features a pentagonal field, silly-sounding terms and a dummy on each team.
 Calvinball: In the comic strip Calvin & Hobbes, Calvinball is a game regularly played by the main characters. The only consistent rule of Calvinball is that "Calvinball may never be played with the same rules twice".
 Double Fanucci: Featured in the computer game Zork Zero, Double Fanucci has mind-bogglingly complex "rules". Legal play can depend on things like the phase of the Moon and the ancestry of the players.

Hoax games
 Numberwang: A recurring "game show" on the sketch series That Mitchell and Webb Look. Similar to Mornington Crescent above, the "contestants" call out random numbers in an attempt to score a "Numberwang", though the responses are scripted and there are no actual rules to winning a "Numberwang".
 Clique: The online satirical gaming magazine Critical Miss featured rules for a card game called Clique, a parody of collectible card games that used printed cards and spurious spoken rules to confuse onlookers.
 Fizzbin: In the Star Trek episode "A Piece of the Action", James T. Kirk created this game while he and Cmdr. Spock were being held prisoner. They "taught" the game to the guards, improvising the rules until their captors were sufficiently distracted, then overpowered them and escaped.
 Cups: In the Friends episode "The One on the Last Night", Chandler invents the card game Cups, making up the result of each card turn in an attempt to give Joey money after he refuses a handout and with all other attempts to "lose" games failing. Joey later loses all the money he "won" off Chandler to Ross in another game of Cups. After failing to convince Ross that the game was made-up, he challenges Ross to another game, inventing "the saucer" to win his money back.

See also
 List of fictional games

References

 List of games with concealed rules
Games with concealed rules
Rules, concealed
 List of games with concealed rules
Game rules